Mandy Heintz (born July 27, 1981) is an American professional racing cyclist, who last rode for UCI Women's Team .

See also
 List of 2016 UCI Women's Teams and riders

References

External links
 

1981 births
Living people
American female cyclists
Sportspeople from San Antonio
21st-century American women